The Belarusian Arabic alphabet (Biełaruski arabski ałfavit) or Arabitsa (Arabica) was based on the Arabic script and was developed in the 16th century (possibly 15th). It consisted of twenty-eight graphemes, including several additions to represent Belarusian phonemes not found in the Arabic language.

The Belarusian Arabic alphabet was used by the Lipka Tatars, who had been invited to settle in Belarusian territory, at the time part of the Grand Duchy of Lithuania. During the 14th–16th centuries they gradually stopped using their own language and started using the Old Belarusian language rendered in the Belarusian Arabic alphabet. Books of that literary tradition are known in Belarusian as Kitab, which is Arabic for book.

Some Polish texts were also written in the Arabic script in the 17th century or later.

Additional graphemes

‎ ‎ 

‎ 

These graphemes were used during the 16th–20th centuries to write Belarusian and Polish.

Equivalence chart

Vowels 
/a/ is consistently written long (that is, with a mater lectionis), while /e/ is consistently written short.

/o/ is most commonly written long.

Consonants

Ligature

See also
 Belarusian Latin alphabet
 Arebica – modified Arabic script used for Serbo-Croatian

References

Further reading
Akiner, Shirin. Religious Language of a Belarusian Tatar Kitab: A Cultural Monument of Islam in Europe. Otto Harrassowitz, 2009.
 Д-р Я. Станкевіч. Беларускія мусульмане і беларуская літаратура арабскім пісьмом. [Адбітка з гадавіка Беларускага Навуковага Таварыства, кн. I.] – Вільня : Друкарня Я. Левіна, 1933 ; Менск : Беларускае коопэрацыйна-выдавецкае таварыства ″Адраджэньне″, 1991 [факсімільн.]. – 3-е выд.
 Антон Антановіч, "Беларускія тэксты, пісаныя арабскім пісьмом"

External links 

 Kitabs, the unique highlight of the Belarusian language at pravapis.org

Arabic alphabets
Arabic alphabet
Lipka Tatars
Tatar language